Åslaug Linge Sunde (26 September 1917 – 3 August 2006) was a Norwegian politician for the Liberal Party.

She served as a deputy representative to the Norwegian Parliament from Møre og Romsdal during the term 1977–1981. In total she met during 6 days of parliamentary session. She grew up in Valldal, but settled in Spjelkavik.

References

1917 births
2006 deaths
People from Ålesund
Liberal Party (Norway) politicians
Women members of the Storting
Deputy members of the Storting
20th-century Norwegian women politicians
20th-century Norwegian politicians